Indonesian is anything of, from, or related to Indonesia, an archipelagic country in Southeast Asia. It may refer to:

 Indonesians, citizens of Indonesia
 Native Indonesians, diverse groups of local inhabitants of the archipelago
 Indonesian women, overview of women's history and contemporary situations
 Indonesian language (Indonesian: Bahasa Indonesia), the official language of Indonesia
 Indonesian languages, overview of some of the 700 languages spoken in Indonesia
 Indonesian names, customs reflecting the multicultural and polyglot nature of Indonesia 
 Indonesian culture, a complex of indigenous customs and foreign influences
 Indonesian art, various artistic expressions and artworks in the archipelago
 Indonesian cinema, a struggling and developing industry
 Indonesian literature, literature from Indonesia and Southeast Asia with shared language roots
 Indonesian music, hundreds of forms of traditional and contemporary music 
 Indonesian philosophy, a tradition of abstract speculation by Indonesians
 Indonesian cuisine, regional and national styles of cooking
 Indonesian geography, an overview of the physical environment of Indonesia
 Indonesian history, fundamentally shaped by trade
 Indonesian wildlife, fauna and ecosystems of Indonesia

See also
 List of islands of Indonesia, nearly 9,000 named islands
 List of Indonesians, notable Indonesian people
 Demographics of Indonesia, characteristics of the population
 

Language and nationality disambiguation pages